Cashtown may refer to the following places:

Cashtown, Pennsylvania, a census-designated place in Adams County
Cashtown, Franklin County, Pennsylvania, an unincorporated community
Cashtown Inn, an inn near Gettysburg, Pennsylvania
Cashtown Corners, part of Clearview, Ontario